Thomas Walter Stark (January 8, 1895 – February 14, 1964) was a U.S.-Scottish soccer right half who spent several seasons in both the National Association Football League and the first American Soccer League.  He earned one cap with the U.S. national team in 1925.

Professional career
Stark, brother of Hall of Fame member Archie Stark, was part of the Kearny Scots team which won the 1915 American Cup.  He also played with Paterson F.C. of the National Association Football League (NAFBL) during the 1918-1919 season.  That year Paterson lost the 1919 National Challenge Cup final to Bethlehem Steel  He was then with Erie A.A. during the 1920-1921 NAFBL season.  In 1921, the American Soccer League replaced the NAFBL and Stark moved to New York Field Club.  In 1924, he moved to the New York Giants, but played only two games before transferring to the Newark Skeeters.  He left the Skeeters and the league after only eight games.

National team
Stark earned one cap with the U.S. national team in a 1-0 loss to Canada on June 27, 1925.

See also
List of United States men's international soccer players born outside the United States

References

Scottish emigrants to the United States
United States men's international soccer players
National Association Football League players
Paterson F.C. players
Erie A.A. (NAFBL) players
Kearny Scots players
American Soccer League (1921–1933) players
New York Field Club players
New York Giants (soccer) players
Newark Skeeters players
1895 births
1964 deaths
Association football defenders
American soccer players
Footballers from Glasgow